The Kumpo, the Samay, and the Niasse are three traditional figures in the mythology of the Diola people in the Casamance (Senegal) and in Gambia.

Multiple times in the course of the year, i.e. during the Journées culturelles, a folk festival in the village is organized. The Samay invites the people of the village to participate with the festivity.

The Kumpo is dressed with palm leaves and wears a stick on the head. At the start of the dance, a young lady binds a colored flag on the stick. She dances for hours with the stick and the flag on the head. He speaks a private secret language and communicates through an interpreter with the spectators.

Social background 
He encourages the community to act as good villagers. He promotes everybody to participate in community life and wishes that all people are enjoying the feast. The festival is a stimulus for the social community life. Not participating to the feast is seen as anti-social behavior. Nobody has the right to be lonely. The whole community enjoys to perform rhythmical music and to dance.

According to the tradition, the Kumpo is not a person but a ghost. There is a strong relationship with the bois sacré. It is not done to ask about the real identity of the Kumpo. He may not be touched and it is considered as a sacrilege to look into the palm leaves. Therefore, he defends himself against intruders with his stick by smashing and pointing.

At the end of the feast, he says goodbye to the community and revokes into the bois sacré.

Related Mythological Figures
Samay
Niasse

References 

Casamance
Jola religion